902 TV was a television station in Greece that was supported by the Communist Party of Greece.

It featured general entertainment programming and was available throughout Greece. On September 10, 2012, ceased operations due to financial difficulties as well as the high costs involved in converting from analogue to digital. On March 2, 2013, starts broadcasting again via Digea.

On 11 August 2013, the television station along with the relevant broadcast license was sold by the party to a private company called A-Horizon Media Ltd, and hence no longer has any affiliation to the party. The station was renamed to Epsilon TV (E TV now Open TV) and broadcasts completely different shows than 902 TV.

References

External links
Official Site

Greek-language television stations
1990 establishments in Greece
2013 disestablishments in Greece
Television channels and stations established in 1990
Television channels and stations disestablished in 2013
Defunct television channels in Greece